Athletics events were contested at the 1957 World University Games in Paris, France, between 5 and 8 September.

Medal summary

Men

Women

Medal table

References
World Student Games (Pre-Universiade) - GBR Athletics 

Athletics at the Summer Universiade
1957 World University Games
Uni